The as-Salam Palace, previously a home of former Iraqi president Saddam Hussein. Since 2012, the palace has been certified as a Republican Palace.

History
Al Salam palace is located on the site of the former Republican Guard Headquarters, which was destroyed in Desert Storm. Construction has been ongoing since then and was completed in early 1999. As-Salam Palace was taken over by coalition forces during the 2003 invasion of Iraq. The palace was significantly damaged during the shock and awe campaign, sustaining several airstrike attacks. The palace served as headquarters for the Joint Area Support Group, and was known to coalition forces as Camp Prosperity and Forward Operating Base (FOB) Prosperity.

Layout and amenities
There are six floors, three of which are usable (others serve as 'false floors'), and two large ballrooms. The palace is internally lined with marble floors decorated with hundreds of thousands of hand-cut pieces, granite walls, and ceilings also adorned with thousands of hand-carved and inlaid hand-painted flowers.

The palace is surrounded by a sequence of square tiles bearing the initials of Saddam Hussein (S & H); the Arabic letters are "Saad" & "Haa"." The tiles are clearly visible from the top of the palace. Iraqis report that the palace dome used to be topped with a life-sized statue of Saddam. 

Fireplaces around the lake in front of the palace are actually vents used to provide fresh air to bunkers below the lake. The bunkers are now inaccessible, having been flooded and sealed off by coalition forces.

In the palace basement lies an entrance to one of many concrete tunnels running beneath the city of Baghdad. These ventilated tunnels were built to provide access to other palaces, government facilities and Baghdad International Airport.

Current use

From April 2009 to January 2010, FOB Prosperity was run by the Joint Area Support Group - Central (JASG-C) 32nd Infantry Brigade Combat Team (IBCT) from Wisconsin. In 2012, the FOB was occupied by the Iraqi Government, which took over operations after the U.S. military drawdown.

See also
 List of United States Military installations in Iraq

References

External links 

Simplified schematic map of the surrounding area
2000 satellite photo at the Federation of American Scientists web site
Saddam has left the building article in the St. Petersburg Times with description and photos

Palaces in Iraq
Official residences in Iraq
Presidential residences
1999 establishments in Iraq